This is a list of mayors of Anderson, Indiana:

External links
A History of Anderson, Indiana
Anderson History

Anderson, Indiana
Anderson, Indiana mayors